Punctelia toxodes is a species of foliose lichen in the family Parmeliaceae. The lichen is a member of the Punctelia rudecta species complex. Found in South Africa, it was first formally described as a new species by English botanist James Stirton in 1878 as Parmelia toxodes. Klaus Kalb and Manuela Götz transferred it to the genus Punctelia in 2007. In his 1878 publication, Stirton did not designate a type specimen, so an epitype was designated in a 2016 publication. The lichen grows on bark and on rocks.

References

toxodes
Lichen species
Lichens described in 1878
Lichens of South Africa
Taxa named by James Stirton